Blockbuster is an American workplace comedy television series created by Vanessa Ramos, who also serves as showrunner and is executive producer. Based upon the Blockbuster brand, the series stars Randall Park as Timmy, the manager in a fictionalized version of the last Blockbuster Video store, set in Grandville, Michigan. The series premiered on Netflix on November 3, 2022. In December 2022, the series was canceled after one season.

Cast and characters

Main 
 Randall Park as Timmy Yoon, the manager of the last operating Blockbuster Video store. He is a dreamer and a lover of films.
 Melissa Fumero as Eliza Walker, Timmy's long-time crush and an employee at the store who works to afford her apartment after splitting with her husband
 Olga Merediz as Connie Serrano, an older employee of Blockbuster
 Tyler Alvarez as Carlos Herrera, a young employee at the store who dreams of being a director, much like Quentin Tarantino
 Madeleine Arthur as Hannah Hadman, a young employee of the store who is also Carlos' friend

Recurring 
 J. B. Smoove as Percy Scott, Timmy's best friend and the landlord of the strip-mall the store is located in
 Kamaia Fairburn as Kayla Scott, Percy's daughter who works at the store
 Leonard Robinson as Aaron Walker, Eliza's husband
 Keegan Connor Tracy as Rene, a potential love interest of Timmy

Guest 
 Ashley Alexander as Mila
 Robyn Bradley as Miranda
 Bobby Moynihan as Stevie, a former child actor

Episodes

Production

Development 

Originally, the series was pitched to executives at NBC; however, they were not interested in green-lighting the series. Universal Television began shopping the series to other networks eventually gaining approval from Netflix; Randall Park was then cast in the lead role. Netflix had previously acquired streaming rights to 1091 Pictures' 2020 documentary film The Last Blockbuster.

Netflix officially announced the series on November 17, 2021. The series is created by Vanessa Ramos who previously worked on shows such as Superstore and Brooklyn Nine-Nine. Along with the series announcement it was confirmed that the series would be produced by Davis Entertainment and Universal Television. It was also announced that David Caspe and Jackie Clarke would be serving as writers on the series, and John Davis would serve as an executive producer under Davis Entertainment. Clarke, Caspe, John Fox and Ramos will serve as executive producers with Bridger Winegar and Robert Petrovic serving as co-executive producers. In February 2022, Deadline Hollywood reported that Payman Benz would be directing four episodes of the series including the pilot. Benz will also serve as an executive producer for those four episodes. In addition, Aleysa Young and Katie Locke O'Brien would serve as directors in the first season in addition to Benz. Rick Page serves as cinematographer for the series.

A first look at the series was released on May 5, 2022 during the Netflix Is A Joke festival, the first look included a look at the style of the series as well as a promo featuring Fumero and Park's characters. The series released on November 3, 2022. On December 16, 2022, Netflix canceled the series after one season.

Casting 

With the announcement of the series in November 2021, Randall Park joined the cast as a character named Timmy, who is described as a dreamer and a lover of movies, per Deadline Hollywood. In February 2022, Melissa Fumero was cast as a character named Eliza who is described as a mother whose marriage to her high school sweetheart is on thin ice, per Hollywood Reporter. In March 2022, Tyler Alvarez, Madeleine Arthur, and Olga Merediz were announced as series regulars playing Carlos, Hannah and Connie, respectively. Additionally, J. B. Smoove was cast as Timmy's best friend Percy and Kamaia Fairburn was cast as Percy's daughter, with both appearing as recurring guest stars. In May 2022, it was reported that Ashley Alexander and Robyn Bradley will appear in guest-starring roles as Mila and Miranda, respectively.

Filming 
Production on the first season began on February 28, 2022. Filming began taking place in Vancouver, Canada, in April 2022, with filming expected to conclude on May 2. However, Fumero confirmed that the series had "almost" wrapped production on May 2 with an Instagram story. Filming for the first season concluded on May 4, 2022.

Release 
The sole season of Blockbuster was released onto Netflix on November 3, 2022, and consisted of 10 episodes. A trailer was released on October 7, 2022.

Reception

The review aggregator website Rotten Tomatoes reported a 22% approval rating with an average rating of 4.7/10, based on 45 critic reviews. The website's critics consensus reads, "Blockbuster tries to leverage nostalgia for the defunct brand, but this contrived workplace comedy is fatally unfunny—be kind, rewind, and chuck it into the return bin." Metacritic, which uses a weighted average, assigned a score of 45 out of 100 based on 23 critics, indicating "mixed or average reviews".

References

External links
 
 

2022 American television series debuts
2022 American television series endings
2020s American workplace comedy television series
English-language Netflix original programming
Television shows filmed in Vancouver
Television shows set in Michigan
Television series by Universal Television
Works about film
TV series